The Downing Street Press Secretary is an adviser to the Prime Minister of the United Kingdom on news media and how to manage the image of the British government to the press. The position is part of the Prime Minister's Office and involves using information on what is happening in the UK and around the world, to decide on how the Prime Minister should present his or her reaction to the media. The incumbent also advises on how to handle news stories and other information which could affect the current Prime Minister or the Ministry.

In September 2022, as part of the incoming Truss Ministry, Alex Wild was appointed Interim Press Secretary replacing Rosie Bate-Williams who had occupied the post during the latter part of the Second Johnson ministry.

Role
The Press Secretary will address the lobby correspondents at 10 Downing Street to give journalists information on events attended by the Prime Minister, as well as current affairs in Downing Street and in Parliament. The Press Secretary works within the  Prime Minister's Office and the Downing Street Press Office.

History
Various political advisers have in the past acted in a press secretary role; Francis Williams, a journalist who had served in the Ministry of Information during the Second World War, served under Clement Attlee, as 'Adviser on Public Relations'. Winston Churchill shunned the role, and did not appoint anyone to the role until several months into his premiership, when he hired Fife Clark. In 1997 Alastair Campbell was appointed by then-Prime Minister Tony Blair. When David Cameron was elected, Gabby Bertin who had previously served as the head of press for the Conservative Party became the Downing Street Press Secretary. She was later replaced by Susie Squire in 2012. In July 2016 when Theresa May became Prime Minister, Lizzie Loudon was appointed as her Press Secretary. Following the resignation of Loudon in April 2017, Paul Harrison took over the role after the general election on 8 June.

Rob Oxley was appointed Press Secretary immediately following Boris Johnson's appointment as Prime Minister on 24 July 2019; he served until March 2020, when he moved to perform a similar role at the Foreign, Commonwealth and Development Office. On 8 October 2020 it was announced that Allegra Stratton would take over from him in an expanded role to include fronting new daily televised press briefings. These were originally scheduled for launch in November 2020 but were repeatedly delayed before being scrapped on 20 April 2021, without any taking place.

Stratton was replaced by Rosie Bate-Williams, a former media special adviser in Downing Street, who in turn was replaced by Alex Wild as part of the new Truss ministry in September 2022.

List of Press Secretaries

See also
Press Office (Royal Household)
Downing Street Director of Communications

References

External links
 Official website
 Prime Minister's Office: press briefings
 Prime Ministers' Press Secretaries, 1945–1998

British Prime Minister's Office
Public relations in the United Kingdom
10 Downing Street